Baron Meston, of Agra in the Indian Empire and Dunnottar in the County of Kincardine, is a title in the Peerage of the United Kingdom. It was created on 29 December 1919 for the Indian civil servant and former Lieutenant-Governor of the United Provinces of Agra and Oudh, Sir James Meston.  the title is held by his grandson, the third Baron, who succeeded his father in 1984. He is a barrister and judge.

Barons Meston (1919)
James Scorgie Meston, 1st Baron Meston (1865–1943)
Dougall Meston, 2nd Baron Meston (1894–1984)
James Meston, 3rd Baron Meston (b. 1950)

The heir apparent is the present holder's son the Hon. Thomas James Dougall Meston (b. 1977)

Arms

References

Kidd, Charles, Williamson, David (editors). Debrett's Peerage and Baronetage (1990 edition). New York: St Martin's Press, 1990.

Baronies in the Peerage of the United Kingdom
Noble titles created in 1919